Bill Dance may refer to:

 Bill Dance (casting director), American casting director
 Bill Dance (television host) (born 1940), angler and host of Bill Dance Outdoors, a fishing television series